The America East Conference baseball tournament, officially known as the America East Conference baseball championship, is the conference baseball championship of the NCAA Division I America East Conference. The top six finishers in the regular season of the conference's seven teams advance to the double-elimination tournament, which rotates among the home fields of each conference member. The winner of the tournament receives an automatic berth to the NCAA Division I Baseball Championship. The format has changed over the years between a six-team and four-team formats. Beginning in 2009, the conference allowed schools to host the championship on fields without lights.

History

1993–1994
See, for example, 1994 North Atlantic Conference baseball tournament.
For the first two tournaments, the event was held over two weekends. On the first, the opening round consisted of best-of-three series, for which the league's eight members were paired. The winners of the four opening round series advanced to a double-elimination final round.

1995–1997
See, for example, 1997 America East Conference baseball tournament.
For these three tournaments, the event was held in a single weekend. Its format was the six-team double-elimination format of NCAA Regionals at the time.

1998–2015
See, for example, 2001 America East Conference baseball tournament.
For eighteen years, the format was a four-team double-elimination tournament. In some years, the event has been held at a campus location, while in others, it has been held at a neutral site.

2016–present
The current format, adopted for the 2016 tournament, is six-team double-elimination event.

Champions

By year
The following is a list of conference champions and sites listed by year.

Championships by school 

The following is a list of conference champions by school.

†Former member of the America East

References